Pepillo is a pet form of the Spanish name José. Pepillo may refer to:

People
Pepillo Salcedo (1816–1814), head of state of the Dominican Republic
Pepillo Salcedo, Dominican Republic, municipality in the Dominican Republic named after the head of state
Pepillo Romero (born 1878), Cuban baseball player
Pepillo (footballer, born 1916), Spanish footballer born José Díaz Payán
Pepillo (footballer, born 1934), Spanish footballer born José García Castro
Pepillo, central character in the 2009 television film Expecting a Miracle